The Kneeling Goddess (Spanish: La diosa arrodillada) is a 1947 Mexican Melodrama film directed by Roberto Gavaldón and starring María Félix, Arturo de Córdova and Rosario Granados. It was shot at the Estudios Churubusco in Mexico City, with sets designed by the art director Manuel Fontanals.

Plot
Married businessman Antonio (Arturo de Córdova) is carrying on an affair with Raquel (María Félix), who wants him to divorce his wife Elena (Rosario Granados). Instead of breaking off his affair with Raquel, he purchases for Elena as an anniversary gift a statue – the titular Kneeling Goddess – which, unbeknownst to him, features Raquel as the model. Obsessed with Raquel, Antonio reinitiates the affair and appears to agree with Raquel to divorce Elena. When Elena dies in mysterious circumstances and Antonio marries Raquel, not everything is as it appears.

Cast
 María Félix as Raquel Serrano  
 Arturo de Córdova as Antonio Ituarte  
 Rosario Granados as Elena 
 Fortunio Bonanova as Nacho Gutiérrez  
 Carlos Martínez Baena as Esteban 
 Rafael Alcayde as Demetrio  
 Eduardo Casado as Licenciado Jiménez  
 Luis Mussot as Dr. Vidaurri 
 Carlos Villarías as Juez  
 Natalia Gentil Arcos as María  
 Paco Martínez as Villarreal 
 Rogelio Fernández as Marinero  
 Alfredo Varela padre as Juez registro civil 
 José Arratia 
 Adolfo Ballano Bueno 
 Fernando Casanova as Empleado juzgado 
 Ana María Hernández as Invitada a fiesta  
 Miguel Ángel López as Joven mensajero  
 José Muñoz as Detective policía  
 Juan Orraca as Detective 
 Manuel Pozos as José  
 Félix Samper as Asociado en mesa redonda  
 Juan Villegas as Empleado de Antonio

Production
Filming began on 10 February 1947 at the Estudios Churubusco in Mexico City.

There were reports that one of the film's screenwriters, José Revueltas, had been ordered, supposedly by director Roberto Gavaldón, to enlarge the role of Rosario Granados to make it as important as that of María Félix. Revueltas vehemently denied this in a letter addressed to the editor of one of the magazines that had published said allegation, and according to Emilio García Riera, "Revueltas defended his integrity in the letter with good reason, but the film is by itself evidence in his favor: [Rosario] Granados has a role that is in effect secondary, that allows to show off much less than that of María Félix."

However, what Revueltas said in his letter, regarding the fact that he and other filmmakers had received "the trust" of the film's producers to fulfill their vision, was contested by Revueltas himself in an interview 30 years later with Paco Ignacio Taibo I, where he affirmed that the plot, the adaptation and the script were beyond his control and that of all those involved. Revueltas affirmed: "[…] there were many of us collaborators and we all put a little here and a little there. […] After we had finished the script, Tito Davison put his hand on it again and things changed again. These kinds of disasters happen in cinema; some correct others and in the end no one remembers what they wrote. On the other hand, directors have their own ideas and ask that these appear in the script. Edmundo Báez said that some scriptwriters were like tailors, that we made the suit tailored to this star or the other. I thought we were not so much tailors as cobblers […]".

The explicit nature (for the time) of certain love scenes generated controversy. Revueltas said that apart from the problems with the script, "[Besides that] there was the censorship: it was the stupidest thing in the world. A censorship of idiots, with which it could not be argued." Several civil organizations criticized the film, claiming that it violated morality. In response to the scandal, the film's producers placed the statue used in the film in the lobby of the Chapultepec cinema, as an attraction factor for spectators. This caused one of the organizations protesting the film, the Comité Pro Dignificación del Vestuario Femenino (CPDVF, "Committee for the Dignification of Women's Clothing"), to steal the statue.

The explicit nature of the film's romantic scenes also affected Félix's relationship with his then-husband, composer Agustín Lara, to the point that calaveras literarias ("skull literature", mocking short poems made in Day of the Dead) and cartoons mocked Felix and Lara's crumbling relationship referring to the film.

Reception
Cinémas d'Amérique Latine called it a "masterpiece of melodrama in which the heroine displays an eroticism out of the ordinary." However, in his book María Félix: 47 pasos por el cine, Paco Ignacio Taibo I, while referring to the film as a "very curious screwball", claimed that it "got lost in a convoluted plot", highlighting the fact that De Córdova's and Félix's character are lovers, only for his character to try to kill her at a certain point.

In Mujeres de luz y sombra en el cine mexicano: la construcción de una imagen (1939–1952), Julia Tuñon wrote: "It is a consistent proposal that contributes with a corpus that is inscribed within a social system of ideas and mentalities that follow a rhythm within the story with its characters."

References

External links 
 

1947 films
1947 drama films
Mexican drama films
1940s Spanish-language films
Films directed by Roberto Gavaldón
Films set in Mexico City
Films set in Guadalajara
Films set in Panama
Mexican black-and-white films
1940s Mexican films